The Australian Dance Awards recognise excellence and promote dance in Australia. They are awarded under the auspices of the Australian Dance Council (Ausdance) for performance, choreography, design, dance writing, teaching and related professions. They especially recognise and honour professional Australian dance artists who have made an outstanding contribution to Australian dance.

History
The awards have their origin in the informal community Dancers' Picnic founded by Keith Bain first held in 1986 on or close to International Dance Day.

In 1997, Ausdance NSW with support from the City of Sydney and The Australian Ballet, presented the inaugural Australian Dance Awards at the Sydney Opera House. Over time, the Awards have evolved into a major industry event. For three years from 2008, the Awards were held in Melbourne and produced by Ausdance Victoria with support from the Joan and Peter Clemenger Trust and The Australian Ballet.

From 2011 until 2017 the location varied, as the awards were held by tender among the state-based organisations of the Ausdance network. In 2018 Ausdance National hosted the event at the Brisbane Powerhouse in Brisbane, Queensland, and owing to the COVID-19 pandemic in Australia, the event was held online by the national body in 2020, covering the years 2018 and 2019.

2019 
Awards not held.

2018
Presented by Ausdance National and Harlequin Floors, the 2018 Australian Dance Awards were presented on Saturday 8 September at Brisbane Powerhouse.

2017
Presented by Ausdance Victoria, Harlequin Floors and Ausdance National, the 2017 Australian Dance Awards were presented on Sunday 24 September at Arts Centre Melbourne.

2016
Presented by Ausdance National and Harlequin Floors, the 2016 Australian Dance Awards were held at The State Theatre Centre of Western Australia, Perth, on Sunday 18 September at 6.30 pm as part of the MoveMe Festival 2016.

2015
The 2015 Australian Dance Awards were presented by Ausdance National at Her Majesty's Theatre in Adelaide on Saturday 12 September 2015.

2014
The 2014 Australian Dance Awards. Held in the Joan Sutherland Theatre of the Sydney Opera House, 9 November 2014. Hosted by Francis Rings and Kip Gamblin.

2013
The 2013 Australian Dance Awards. Held at The Playhouse of the Canberra Theatre Centre, 6 August 2013. Hosted by Andrea Close.

2012
The 2012 Australian Dance Awards. Held at Heath Ledger Theatre, State Theatre Centre, Perth. Hosted by Verity James. Winners were:

2011
The 2011 Australian Dance Awards. Held at QPAC Playhouse, Brisbane. Hosted by Fenella Kernebone. Winners were:

2010
The 2010 Australian Dance Awards. Hosted by Neil Pigot. Held at Melbourne's Arts Centre, State Theatre. Winners were:

2009
The 2009 Australian Dance Awards winners were:

2008

The 2008 Australian Dance Awards were hosted by Michael Veitch. The winners were:

2006
Hosted by Todd McKenney, Dancing with the Stars and Rachael Beck from It Takes Two. The winners were:

2005 
Hosted by Chloe Dallimore, the star of the Australian production of the musical The Producers and Eddie Perfect. The winners were:

2004

2003
Hosted by Libbi Gorr. The winners were:

2002

2001

2000

1999

1998

1997

References

External links

Dance in Australia
Dance awards
Australian performing arts awards
Awards established in 1997